Budești is a commune in Chișinău municipality, Moldova. It is composed of two villages, Budești and Văduleni.

Notable people
 Ion Negrei

References

Communes of Chișinău Municipality